Timothy Schreiber is a London-based, design artist. Schreiber's limited edition items are represented by various galleries including  Wexler Gallery and 88-Gallery.

In 2013 Schreiber started working in cast glass with his "icicle tables" being his first series of furniture in this material. He applied Chinese traditional glass casting technique to this called Liuli, making his designs the first-ever LiuLi furniture.

Awards and honors
 red dot design award 2008: Morphogenesis_lounge_chair
 London creative competition (LICC) 2009 honorable mention and shortlisting: Morphogenesis_lounge_chair and E_volve_table

References

External links
Official Website
Timothy Schreiber on Artnet
Timothy Schreiber on incollect

Year of birth missing (living people)
Living people
German emigrants to England
German furniture designers